I 2 soliti idioti is a 2012 Italian film directed by Enrico Lando, based on the comedy series of the same name.

It is a sequel to 2011 film I soliti idioti: Il film.

Cast
 as Ruggero De Ceglie / Various
 as Gianluca De Ceglie / Various
Miriam Giovanelli as Perla Madonna / Sheron
Teo Teocoli as Prof. Luigi Pelosi
Silvia Cohen as Mrs. Pelosi
Gianmarco Tognazzi as Siro Pileri
 as the nurse
Cristina Del Basso as Erica
Carlotta Maggiorana as Emma

References

External links

2012 films
Films directed by Enrico Lando
Italian sequel films
Italian comedy films
2010s Italian-language films
2012 comedy films
2010s Italian films